Melinda McLeod (born 12 February 1993) is an Australian female professional BMX cyclist. Renowned for her jumping ability, she is a six time world champion and has won multiple gold medals at the Australian National Championships. She is currently riding for an American bicycle company called Intense and is a member of the AIS High Performance Program. In 2012, McLeod narrowly missed selection onto the Australian Olympic Team and was later internally named as an alternate athlete. Her dream is to win an Olympic gold medal.

At the 2007 World Championships in Canada, McLeod won two gold medals, making her the most successful Australian rider at the titles.

McLeod was named Junior Sport Star of the Year for her efforts in BMX in 2008. She retired from BMX Racing at the end of 2016.

Career highlights 
 Two gold medals at the 2007 BMX World Championships
 Won Gold at the 2008 BMX World Championships in China
 2011 Junior Elite Women World Champion in Copenhagen, Denmark
 Won multiple Golds at Australian Nationals Championships

References

External links
 Photo from the 2007 Australian National Championships with Lacey Oliver
 Photo from the 2007 Australian National Championships
 

1993 births
Living people
BMX riders
Australian female cyclists
Cyclists from Queensland